The Houston Astros are an American professional baseball team based in Houston, Texas that competes in Major League Baseball (MLB). The Astros are a member of the MLB's American League, having moved from the National League in 2013. The Astros are one of two MLB teams based out of Texas, the other being the Texas Rangers. The team began with the name of the Colt .45s in 1962 and changed their name to the Astros in 1965 when they began playing in the Astrodome. The team has played in three ballparks in Houston: Colt Stadium (1962–1964), the Astrodome (1965–1999), and Minute Maid Park (2000–), a stadium with a retractable roof. The Astros hold two World Series titles (2017 & 2022) and five pennants (one in the National League and four in the American League).

Major League Baseball comes to Texas

 
From 1888 until 1961, Houston's professional baseball club was the minor league Houston Buffaloes, but city residents chafed at the idea of Houston as just a minor league city. One of those men was George Kirksey, a public relations man who became well known in the city in the amid 1940s for his work in public relations. With the help of businessman Bill Kirkland, they helped call a meeting between anyone interested in bring baseball to Houston. This meeting was held on January 4, 1957 at the First City National Bank and would soon lead to the formation of the Houston Sports Association. At the helm of president would be Craig F. Cullinan Jr., who provided the initial finance.  There had been attempts to lure a team to the city, such as a 1952 bid to buy the St. Louis Cardinals for $4.25 million. Attempts to buy the Philadelphia Athletics in 1954 and Cleveland Indians in 1958 also fell short. The HSA made formal applications to both the National and American League in June 1958, but neither league was particularly serious about expansion, regardless of the prospect of the city building efforts for a stadium. It was here that Kirskey and Cullinan aligned with R. E. "Bob" Smith (with his own deep pockets) and Judge Roy Hofheinz to eschew trying to move an existing team or lobby further for expansion and instead go with a third option. On July 27, 1959, the HSA aligned with attorney William Shea on his proposal for a third major league, which would be known as the Continental League. Cullinan represented Houston to go along with the original announcement of teams in Denver, Minneapolis–St. Paul, New York City, and Toronto. Baseball legend Branch Rickey was appointed as league president. Wanting to protect potential new markets, both existing leagues chose to expand from eight teams to ten. However, plans eventually fell through for the Houston franchise after the Houston Buffaloes owner, Marty Marion, could not come to an agreement with the HSA to sell the team. However, the push to strike fear into the leagues paid off with one force: Congress, which looked at the antitrust exemption that MLB had for decades; while the bill went back to committee, the vocal discussion inspired the Continental League to fold on August 2, 1960 as Shea worked on a deal with MLB.

On October 17, the National League granted an expansion franchise to the Houston Sports Association in which their team could begin play in the 1962 season. According to the Major League Baseball Constitution, the Houston Sports Association was required to obtain territorial rights from the Houston Buffaloes in order to play in the Houston area, and again negotiations began to purchase the team. Eventually, the Houston Sports Association succeeded in purchasing the Houston Buffaloes, at that point majority-owned by William Hopkins, on January 17, 1961. The Buffs played one last minor league season as the top farm team of the Chicago Cubs in 1961 before being succeeded by the city's NL club. Gabe Paul was named first general manager in October 1960, but disputes with Hofheinz meant that he would leave in the spring of 1961.

The name for the team would be the Colt .45s, picked by both contest and suggestion. Kirksey, desiring a relevant name rather than just using the minor league name of Buffs (as pushed by a portion of the organization), stated his preference for Colt .45s due to being both "The Gun that Won the West" and looking for a promo deal with the Colt Firearms Company. Owners of the team desired to have a "Name the Team" contest, which saw thousands of entries such as Generals, Rebels, Shippers, Sports, and Sams. After sorting out the names, William Irving Neder and his entry of Colt .45 was deemed the winner.
The colors selected were navy blue and orange. The first team was a collection of cast-offs culled mostly through an expansion draft after the 1961 season. The Colt .45s and their expansion cousins, the New York Mets, took turns choosing players left unprotected by the other National League franchises.

The Colt .45s began their existence playing at Colt Stadium. Colt Stadium, however, was just a temporary field until Judge Hofheinz could build an indoor stadium.

Many of those associated with the Houston Buffaloes organization were allowed by the ownership to continue in the major league. Manager Harry Craft, who had joined Houston in 1961, remained in the same position for the team until the end of the 1964 season. General manager Spec Richardson also continued with the organization as business manager, but was later promoted again to the same position with the Astros from 1967 until 1975. Although most players for the major league franchise were obtained through the 1961 Major League Baseball expansion draft, Buffs players J.C. Hartman, Pidge Browne, Jim Campbell, Ron Davis, Dave Giusti, and Dave Roberts were chosen to continue as major league ball players.

Similarly, the radio broadcasting team remained with the new Houston major league franchise. Loel Passe worked alongside Gene Elston as a color commentator until he retired from broadcasting in 1976. Elston continued with the Astros until 1986.

1962–1964: The Colt .45s era
The Colt .45s started their inaugural season on April 10, 1962 against the Chicago Cubs. Harry Craft was named Houston's first manager while Paul Richards served as general manager after being hired in September of 1961 (he had previously served as manager of the Baltimore Orioles). The Colt .45s finished eighth among the National League's ten teams. Richard "Turk" Farrell was the highlight pitcher of the first year. A starter for the Colt .45s, he was primarily a relief pitcher when he was with the Los Angeles Dodgers and Philadelphia Phillies. Turk lost twenty games in 1962, but had an ERA of 3.02 while being selected to both All-Star games that year.

There was a bright spot in the line up in 1962. Román Mejías, who was acquired from the Pittsburgh Pirates in the expansion draft, was named the Colt .45s starting right fielder. It was in Houston that Mejías would play the best season of his career. While he played better the first half of the season, an injury slowed him the second half of the season. However, he still finished with a .286 batting average, 24 home runs, and 76 RBIs. His modesty and his hard play made him a fan favorite that year. Despite his good year Mejías was traded to the Boston Red Sox in the fall of 1962. Late in the year, Cullinan sold his shares to Smith due to his disapproval of Hofheinz's autocratic control over operations.

1963 saw more young talent mixed with seasoned veterans. Jimmy Wynn, Rusty Staub, and Joe Morgan all made their major league debuts in the 1963 season. However, the Colt .45s finished in ninth place with a 66–96 record. The team was still building, trying to find that perfect mix to compete. Craft had plenty of rookies to play and on September 27 he fielded an all rookie team versus the New York Mets. Houston lost 10–3 but it was a glimpse of what was to come in the next few seasons.

The 1964 campaign began on a sad note. Pitcher Jim Umbricht died of cancer just before opening day. Umbricht was the only Colt .45s pitcher to post winning records in the Colt .45s first two seasons. So well liked by players and fans the Colt .45 retired his Jersey number 32 in 1965. Umbricht was 33 years old.

On the field the 1964 Colt .45s got off to a quick start, but it would not last. Manager Harry Craft was fired presumably for wanting to put more money towards experienced players, and not spend on Roy Hofheinz personal glamors inside the owners box, historians say this was the start of the downfall of the first years of the Astros and ultimately the Judge. Craft was replaced by one of the Colt .45s coaches, Luman Harris. Some of that up and coming talent the front office wanted to showcase was a young pitcher by the name of Larry Dierker. He started versus the San Francisco Giants on his 18th birthday. He lost the game but it was the beginning of a long relationship with the Houston organization.

Just on the horizon the structure of the new domed stadium was more prevalent and the way baseball was watched in Houston, and around the league, was about to change. On December 1, 1964, Hofheinz announced the team would be rechristened as the Houston Astros, wanting to avoid having to possibly pay the Colt Firearms Company a share of the profits due to the Colt .45 name. Hofheinz stated "We felt the space idea was more logical because the ballclub is in Houston -- Space City, U.S.A., and our Spring Training headquarters is in Cocoa Beach, Fla., at Cape Kennedy -- Launching Pad, U.S.A." He also asked famed astronaut Alan Shepard for advice on picking between Astros and Stars, and Shepard liked the former due to it being short for Astronaut.

1965–1970: The Great Indoors: The move into the Astrodome

The opening of the Astrodome ended up being one of the final straws in the end of the partnership of Smith and Hofheinz as owners, with Smith and his wife not being invited to the executive suite to celebrate the stadium's opening night, which saw President Lyndon B. Johnson attend. The two had feuded due to Hofheinz making decisions unilaterally without consulting Smith. Heated arguments led to Smith arguing with Hofheinz over the idea that one of them had to buy out the other. Hofheinz, having to raise $7.5 million to do so, raised the money in the span of a week that led to Smith's resignation from the board on August 3, 1965. Now the sole owner of the franchise and his vision of a domed stadium to play ball indoors complete, the Colt .45 moved into their new domed stadium in 1965. The Judge called the new domed stadium the Astrodome. The name was in honor of Houston's importance to the country's space program and to match with the meaning of the name, the Colt .45s were renamed the Astros. The new park, coined as the "Eighth Wonder of the World" did little to help the play on the field. While several "indoor" firsts were accomplished, the team still finished ninth in the standings. The attendance was high not because of the team accomplishments, but because people came from miles around to see the Astrodome. Paul Richards was dismissed by Hofheinz in December of 1965.

Just as the excitement was settling down over the Astrodome, the 1966 season found something new to put the domed stadium in the spotlight once again; the field. Grass would not grow in the new park, since the roof panels had been painted to reduce the glare that was causing players on both the Astros and the visiting team to miss routine pop flies. A new artificial turf was created called "AstroTurf" and once again Houston would be involved in yet another change in the way the game was played. On May 9, Kirksey announced his resignation from the HSA and sold his two percent stake, ending an association of six years that saw him and others help bring baseball to Houston.

With new manager Grady Hatton the Astros got hot right away. By May they were in second place in the National League and looked like a team that could contend. Joe Morgan and Sonny Jackson appeared on the cover of Sports Illustrated, an Astros first, and Morgan was named as a starter on the All-Star Team. The Astros cooled as quickly as they got hot. They lost Jimmy Wynn for the season after he crashed into an outfield fence in Philadelphia and Morgan had broken his knee cap. There were some good notes however. Sonny Jackson set a league record with 49 steals, and led the Astros with a .292 batting average. The Astros were a young team full of talent that was not yet refined and the inconsistencies of their youth was viewed on the field.

1967 saw third baseman Eddie Mathews join the Astros. Mathews, however, would play first base. The slugger hit his 500th home run while in Houston. He would be traded late in the season and Doug Rader would be promoted to the big leagues. Rookie Don Wilson pitched a no-hitter on June 18, Fathers Day, against the Braves. It was the first no hit, shut out, pitched in team history and in the Astrodome. Jimmy Wynn also provided some enthusiasm in 1967. The 5 ft 9 in Wynn was becoming known not only for how often he hit home runs, but for the distance of the home runs. Wynn set club records with 37 home runs, and 107 RBIs. He also had a pinch hit single in the All-Star game that year; another Astros first. As the season came to a close the Astros found themselves once again in ninth place and a winning percentage below .500. The team looked good on paper, but could not seem to make it work on the field.

Dr. Martin Luther King Jr.'s assassination delayed the start to the 1968 season. When Robert F. Kennedy was killed two months later, Major League Baseball let teams decide if they would postpone games or not. Astros management decided to not postpone games. Rusty Staub and Bob Aspromonte sat out in protest. Both were traded at season's end.

April 15 saw a pitching duel that was one for the ages. Mets pitcher Tom Seaver and Don Wilson faced each other in a pitching duel that lasted six hours. Seaver went ten frames allowing no walks and just two hits. Wilson went nine innings and allowed five hits and three walks. After the starters pitched 11 relievers, seven for the New York Mets and four for the Astros tried to end the game. The game finally ended when Aspromonte hit a shot toward Mets shortstop Al Weis. Weis had been perfect all night at short, but he was not the same player he was six hours earlier. Weis was not quick enough to make the play and the ball zipped into left field allowing Norm Miller to score. Houston hosted the All-Star game in 1968 and as expected in the "Year of the Pitcher" the game was a low scoring match that saw the National league winning 1–0. Grady Hatton was fired as manager on June 18 and Harry Walker replaced him. Walker had been fired from Pittsburgh the year before The Astros ended the season in last place.

With baseball expansion and trades the Astros had dramatically changed in 1969. Gone were Aspromonte, Cuellar, and Staub, just to name a few. Added to the team were catcher Johnny Edwards, outfielder Jesús Alou, infielder Denis Menke and pitcher Denny Lemaster, who would help the Astros finish better than they had since they started playing ball in 1962. Wilson continued pitching great and on May 1 threw the second no hitter of his career. He was just 24 years of age and was second to only Sandy Koufax for career no hit wins. Wilson's no hitter lit the Astros' fire and six days later the Astros tied a major league record by turning seven double plays. By May's end the Astros had put together a ten-game winning streak. The Astros infield tandem of Menke and Joe Morgan continued to improve and provided power at the plate and great defense. Morgan had 15 homers and stole 49 bases while Menke led the Astros with 90 RBIs. The Menke/Morgan punch was beginning to come alive.

On September 10, the Astros were tied for fourth and only two games out of first, but fell to the Atlanta Braves three days later. Larry Dierker had no hit the Braves and was one out away from ending it when Félix Millán broke it up with a single. The Astros scored two runs in the 13th, but ex-teammates Aspromonte and Jackson led a three-run Braves comeback. It seemed to be the turning point for the Astros as they slid into fifth place and Atlanta went on to win the division. The series against the Braves gave the Astros, and the fans, a taste of a race. It was also the first time in the team's history that they did not finish the season below .500. 1969 saw both the 1962 expansion teams improve, but it was the New York Mets that climbed to the top winning the World Series.

In 1970 the Astros were expected to be a serious threat in the National League West. The year started with a bang when Doug Rader clobbered a shot into the upper reserve (gold) seats in left field during an exhibition game on April 3. Nine days later Jimmy Wynn knocked one into the purple seats (just below the gold) proving that the unreachable area of the dome was reachable. The seats were repainted marking this feat. No other Astro ever hit a home run into that part of the Astrodome.

In June, 19-year-old César Cedeño was called up and immediately showed signs of being a superstar. The Dominican outfielder was often compared to Willie Mays and Roberto Clemente. Cedeño batted .310 after being called up from the minors. Not to be outdone Denis Menke batted .304 and Jesús Alou batted .306. The Astros' batting average was up by 19 points compared to the season before. The team looked good, but the Astros' ERA was up. Larry Dierker and Don Wilson had winning records, but the pitching staff as a whole had an off season.
Houston finish in fourth place in 1970 and saw the Cincinnati Reds take the division title, something that would become common in the 1970s.

1971–1974: The Boys in Orange
The fashion trends of the 1960s had started taking root in baseball. Players were growing their hair longer and loud colors were starting to appear on teams' uniforms, including the Astros. In 1971 the Astros made some changes to their uniform: they kept the same style they had in previous seasons, but inverted the colors. What was navy blue was now orange and what was orange was now a lighter shade of blue. The players last names were added to the back of the jerseys. The uniform fabric was also changed to what was at the time revolutionizing the industry – polyester. Belts were replaced by elastic waistbands and jerseys zipped up instead of buttons. The uniforms became popular with fans but would only last for four seasons. The Astros would shock baseball and the fashion world four years later.

In May of that year, George Kirksey died in an automobile accident. The Astros honored him with a plaque placed in the Astrodome that bore his name along with the inscription of "He helped make a dream come true". The Astros acquired Roger Metzger from the Chicago Cubs in the off-season.  This moved Menke to first base and Bob Watson to the outfield. The Astros got off to a slow start and the pitching and hitting averages were down. Larry Dierker was selected to the All-Star game in 1971, but due to an arm injury he could not make it. Don Wilson took his place and pitched two scoreless innings. César Cedeño led the club with 81 RBIs and the league with 40 doubles, but batted just .264 and had 102 strikeouts in his second season with the Astros. 
J. R. Richard made his debut in September of the 1971 season against the Giants. The 6 ft 8 in Richard struck out 15 to tie the debut record of Karl Spooner set in 1954. Richards won the game 5–3. The city of Houston saw they had the talent for a winning team and were growing tired of finishing in the middle of the pack. The Astros were about to pull off one of the most controversial trades in team history in the off season.

November 1971 trade

On November 29, 1971, the Houston Astros and Cincinnati Reds made a trade that was one of the most impactful in the history of the sport, and helped the Reds earn the nickname of "The Big Red Machine". The Reds would ultimately get the better end of the deal. The Astros sent second baseman Joe Morgan, infielder Denis Menke, pitcher Jack Billingham, and outfielders César Gerónimo and prospect Ed Armbrister to Cincinnati for first baseman Lee May, second baseman Tommy Helms and infielder Jim Stewart. Morgan had not gotten along with manager  Harry Walker, who he believed was a racist. Morgan and company would help strengthen a Reds team that had made the World Series in 1970 into one that would reach the Series in 1972 and then win back-to-back World Series in 1975 and 1976. 

For his part, May added more power to the lineup in 1972 (Helms and Stewart on the other hand did not). An All-Star in 1970 and 1971, May returned to the All-Star game in 1972, this time as an Astro. May, Wynn, Rader and Cedeño all had 20 or more home runs and Watson hit 16. Cedeño also led the Astros with a .320 batting average and 55 stolen bases. Cedeño made his first All-Star Game in 1972 and became the first Astro in team history to hit for the cycle in August versus the Reds.

Houston led the league with 708 runs and were playing the first winning season in team history, but the Reds were hot and pulling away fast. Despite having a winning season, the Astros fired manager Harry Walker and replaced him with Leo Durocher. The skipper of the 1951 New York Giants had his best seasons behind him and the Astros finished 16–15 with Durocher as manager. Still, it was the best season the Astros had had to date with a strike-shortened season at 84–69, a distant second to the Reds. It would be as close as they would get to winning a title for several more seasons.

With a full intended season in 1973, the Astros aimed for a first consecutive run of winning seasons and the promise of more. The Astros' run production was down to the season before even though the same five sluggers the year before were still punching the ball out of the park. Lee May led the Astros with 28 home runs and César Cedeño batted .320 with 25 home runs. Bob Watson hit the .312 mark and drove in 94 runs. Rader and Jimmy Wynn both had 20 or more home runs. Wynn's 20 came despite a season-long slump.

Where the Astros were hurting was in their pitching. Larry Dierker and Tom Griffin sat out for long periods of time due to injuries and Don Wilson had a bad year and spent time in the bullpen. Pitchers Dave Roberts and Jerry Reuss won 16 or more games each, with little help from the bullpen. The Astros bullpen was in bad shape with nobody having more than six saves.

Leo Durocher decided to retire at season's end after taking ill in mid-season. Durocher took the Astros to an 82–80 finish and the Astros finished in fourth place. Of note is that it was the first time the Astros had consecutive winning seasons. It would not occur again until the decade ended.

The Astros didn't fare much better in 1974, but did finish with a .500 record under new manager Preston Gómez. The Astros again finished in fourth place in the National League West. The Astros were in need of rebuilding both on and off the field. Owner Roy Hofheinz's empire was beginning to fall apart and he would soon have to sell. The Astrodomain had accumulated a $38 million debt and Hofheinz, due to illness, was in no position to try to rebuild. 1975 would see many new changes in the Astros system.

1975–1979: The rainbow era

With the $38 million debit of the Astrodomain, control was passed from Judge Roy Hofheinz to GE Credit and Ford Motor Credit. This included the Astros. 1975 proved to be a bad year for the Astros. The creditors were just interested in preserving asset value of the team so any money spent management had to find or save somewhere else. Tal Smith returned to the Astros from the New York Yankees to a team that needed a lot of work and did not have a lot of money. However, there would be some bright spots that would prove to be good investments in the near future.

The year started on a sad note. Pitcher Don Wilson was found dead in the passenger seat of his car on January 5, 1975. Cause of death was asphyxiation by carbon monoxide. Wilson was 29 years old. Wilson's 5-year-old son Alex also died as his room was connected to the garage. Wilson's number was retired on April 13, 1975.

The 1975 season was the introduction of the Astros new-look uniforms. Many teams were going away from the traditional uniform and the Astros were no exception. The uniforms had multishade stripes of orange, red and yellow in front and in back behind a large dark blue star over the midsection. The same stripes run down the pant legs. Players numbers not only appeared on the back of the jersey, but also on the pant leg. The bright stripes were meant to appear as a fiery trail like a rocket sweeping across the heavens. The uniforms were panned by the critics, but the public liked them and versions started appearing at the high school and little league level. The uniform was so different from what other teams wore that the Astros wore it both at home and on the road until 1980.

Besides the bright new uniforms there were some other changes. Lee May was traded to Baltimore for much talked about rookie second baseman Rob Andrews and utility player Enos Cabell. Cabell, played primarily behind Baltimore third baseman Brooks Robinson when he arrived in Houston he took advantage of his opportunity and became the everyday third baseman for Houston. Cabell would go on to become a big part of the team's success in later years. Bob Watson moved to first base with May gone and was a bright spot in the line up batting .324 and 85 RBIs.

The two biggest moves the Astros did in the off season were the acquisition of Joe Niekro and José Cruz. The Astros bought Niekro from the Braves for almost nothing. Niekro had bounced around the big leagues with minimal success. His older brother Phil Niekro had started teaching Joe how to throw his knuckleball and Joe was just starting to use it when he came to the Astros. Niekro won six games and saved four and had an ERA of 3.07.

José Cruz was also a steal, in retrospect, from the Cardinals. The Cards were in a position where they had too many outfielders and Cruz was having a hard time breaking in. He showed promise in 1973, but only had a batting average of .227. Not wanting to give up on Cruz he was given the chance to prove himself again 1974. Cruz improved but lost his job to rookie Bake McBride. He was sold to the Astros for $25,000. Cruz's role in Astros history would go on to see his number retired as an Astro.

The 1975 season was the worst the team had ever seen in their history. Their record was 64–97, far worse than the expansion Colt .45's. It was the worst record in baseball and manager Preston Gómez was fired late in the season and replaced by Bill Virdon. Virdon had managed the Yankees and Pirates before joining Houston. The Astros played .500 ball under Virdon in the last 34 games of the season.

With Bill Virdon as the manager the Astros improved greatly in 1976 finishing in third place with an 80–82 record. A healthy César Cedeño was a key reason for the Astros bouncing back in 1976. Bob Watson continued to show consistency and led the club with a .313 average and 102 RBIs. José Cruz became Houston's everyday left fielder and hit .303 with 28 stolen bases.

1976 saw the end of Larry Dierker's career as an Astro, but before it was all over he would throw a no-hitter and win the 1,000 game in the Astrodome. He was dealt to St Louis in the off-season, but would return to Houston and be a big part of the organization.

The Astros finished in third place again in 1977 with a record improved at just one more win than the season before at 81–81. The Astros were still in need of consistent players at key positions. The middle infield was a trouble spot that saw different player playing second and short on any given night. One such player was Art Howe. Howe who almost gave up on baseball before getting a chance in Houston was willing to play anywhere just to get playing time. Howe would hit .264 with 58 RBIs while playing at second, short, and third. Howe, like Larry Dierker would also become part of the Astros future.

While J. R. Richard, Joe Niekro and Joaquín Andújar had winning seasons the pitching was still in need of help. The Astros did not have a dominant lefty in the rotation. Floyd Bannister was thought to be that dominant lefty, but the rookie pitcher inconsistent and was 8–9 with an ERA of 4.03. It would be a long time before the Astros had a dominant left hand pitcher.

One of the big problems the Astros had was they were unable to compete in the free agent market. Ford Motor Credit Company was still in control of the team and was looking to sell the Astros, but they were not going to spend money on better players. Most of the talent the Astros had was either farm grown or bought on the cheap. 1978 saw the Astros slip to fifth place with a 74–88 record.

While money issues hurt the Astros so did injuries. Cedeño was out most of the season due to a knee injury and Howe dealt with a broken finger. José Cruz really started to shine as an Astros and led the team with a .315 average with 83 RBIs and 37 steals. J. R. Richard was the only Astros pitch that had a stellar year. He threw two shut games, back to back, in May, had 303 strike out for the season and won 18.

It may have been an off year for the Astros, but they were building for the future. Players like Denny Walling and Rafael Landestoy were proving to be talented reserves. The starting pitching was looking good with J. R. Richard, Ken Forsch and Joe Niekro. And relief pitcher Joe Sambito was settling in as the closer. The foundation was being laid for making a serious run at winning their first pennant.

1979 would prove to be a big turn around in Astros history and during the off season the Astros made an effort to fix some of their problem areas. They traded Floyd Bannister to Seattle for shortstop Craig Reynolds and acquired catcher Alan Ashby from Toronto for pitcher Mark Lemongello. Reynolds and Ashby were both solid in their positions and gave Houston a much needed fix.

The 1979 season started with a huge boost from pitcher Ken Forsch, who no-hit the Braves in the second game of the season. This would only be the beginning of the excitement that was to come in 1979.

Houston also learned in May that Dr. John McMullen had agreed to buy the Astros. Now with an owner and not Ford Motor Credit in charge the Astros would be able to compete in the free agent market.

In July, the Astros went to Cincinnati leading the National League West, something the Cincinnati Reds were accustomed to doing. July 4 fireworks erupted when, tired of the Cincinnati Reds taunting pitcher Joaquín Andújar, a fight broke out involving César Cedeño and Ray Knight. Houston went on to win the game and had a ten-game lead in the NL west. But holding onto the lead would prove to be a challenge for the Astros who now felt the pressure of being on top of the division.

The other team that was not too happy seeing the Astros on top in the west was the Los Angeles Dodgers. The Dodgers had challenged and won the division over the Big Red Machine and won the division in 1977 and 1978. At the end of July the Dodgers came to the Astrodome to play in a game that saw Forsch give up only three hits to the Dodgers. The game turn out to be more than an outstanding pitching performance by Forsch. The Dodgers taunted Cedeño, causing the aggravated Cedeño to throw a hard fastball in the Dodgers dugout. Later that inning Enos Cabell was hit by a pitch and this time the benches did empty. Houston's lead in the division was shrinking and the heat of the Houston summer was only matched by the Astros tempers.

The Astros were playing great ball. José Cruz and Enos Cabell both stole 30 bases. Joe Niekro had a great year with 21 wins and 3.00 ERA. J. R. Richard won 18 games and set a new personal strikeout record at 313. Joe Sambito came into his own with 22 saves as the Astros closer. Things were going as they should for a team that could win the west.

The Astros and Reds battled the final month of the season. The Reds pulled ahead of the Astros by a game and a half. Later that month they split a pair and the Reds kept the lead. And that would be how it would end. The Astros finished with their best record to that point at 89–73 and  games behind the NL winner Reds. The Astros proved they were contenders and they were ready to show Major League Baseball how serious a contender they were.

1980: Here come the Astros
With Dr. John McMullen as sole owner of the Astros the team would now benefit in ways a corporation could not give them. The rumors of the Astros moving out of Houston, which started when Judge Roy Hofheinz's Astrodomain started to crumble, had been stopped and the Astros were now able to compete in the free agent marketed. McMullen showed the city of Houston that he too wanted a winning team by signing nearby Alvin native Nolan Ryan to the first million dollar a year deal. Prior to joining the Astros, Ryan had four no-hitters and struck out 383 in one season. Win or lose, Ryan would fill the seats.

Joe Morgan returned to the Astros in 1980. When Morgan left Houston he was a good player that became a great player with the Cincinnati Reds. Morgan had always regretted leaving the Astros but his destiny was with the Cincinnati Reds. Now back in Houston, his two MVP awards and three World Series rings with him; Morgan wanted to help make the Astros a pennant winner.

1980 saw one of the best pitching line ups the Astros ever had. Ryan with his fastball, Joe Niekro with his knuckle ball that frustrated hitters and J. R. Richard with his imposing 6 ft 8 in frame and terrifying pitches. Teams felt lucky to face Ken Forsch who was a double digit game winner in the previous two seasons. Richard became the first Astros pitcher to start an All-Star game. He pitched two inning striking out three, including Reggie Jackson. Three days later after a medical examination Richard was told to rest his arm. During a workout in the Astrodome on July 30 Richard collapsed. He had suffered a stroke and was taken to the hospital. A blood clot that had made his arm feel tired had moved to his neck and cut off blood flow to the brain. Surgery was done to save his life. The Astros had lost their ace pitcher after a 10–4 start with a stingy 1.89 ERA. Although he attempted to come back, Richard would never again pitch a big league game.

The loss of J. R. Richard hit the Astros hard and the team had a hard time scoring runs. The Astros slipped to third place in the division behind the Dodgers and the Cincinnati Reds, the Astros bounced back with a ten-game winning streak that put the team back in first place in the division. The Dodgers regained the lead by two games as they came to Houston on September 9. The Astros showed the Dodgers how serious they were by winning the first two games of the series to put both clubs tied for first in the division. By season's end the Astros held a three-game lead over the Dodgers with three games left in the season against the Dodgers. The Dodgers swept all three games thus making the two teams have to square off in a one-game playoff the next day to see who would be division champ.

The Astros season had come down to a one-game playoff in Los Angeles. The Astros had faced the Dodgers three best pitchers the three previous days and would now face Dave Goltz who held the hopes of the Dodgers in his hand. The Astros would make the most of facing Goltz. Terry Puhl scored on a fielders choice in the first to give the Astros a 2–0 early lead. In the third Art Howe knocked one out to give the Astros a 4–0 lead. Howe would deliver the final blow to the Dodgers in the fourth to give the Astros 7. The frustrated Dodgers showed third discontent when Ashby, trying to score another run for the Astros, slid into home where Joe Ferguson, who did not hold the ball when Puhl scored, was waiting with ball in hand to tag Ashby out. He then gave Ashby a knee to the ribs causing a benches to clear. The Dodger faithful began tossing food at the Astros players and on the field forcing the game to be stopped until order was restored. The Astros went on to clinch the division for the first time in team history. While excited by the victory the team would have to fly cross country to face the Phillies the next day for game one of the NLCS.

The 1980 NLCS: A hard-fought battle
The Astros had a coast-to-coast flight lasting six hours the night before game one of the NLCS and had to face Steve Carlton who had beaten the Astros six straight times. With that said the experts gave the Phillies the edge in beating the Astros in game one of the NLCS. The Phillies would win game one, but the Astros did not make it easy. The Astros went up 1–0 in the third and Astros pitcher Ken Borsch, who gave up four hits in the first three innings, settled down retiring the side 1–2–3 in the fourth and fifth innings. Pete Rose reached on an infield-hit in the sixth, but Forsch went right back to work retiring the next two batters. Then Greg Luzinski stepped up to the plate. Luzinski worked Forsch to a full count, fouled off the next pitch and then sent a bomb to the 300 level seats of Veterans Stadium for a two-run homer. The Phillies added an insurance run in the next inning when Garry Maddox stole third and ex-Astro Greg Gross looped a single to left allowing Gross to score. Tug McGraw came in for the eighth inning and the Astros went three up, three down. Luis Pujols was able to work McGraw for a walk in the ninth, but that would be all the Astros would get from him as McGraw retired the next three batters leading the Phillies to a 3–1 and one game up in the series.

Nolan Ryan would get the call in game two of the NLCS to go against Dick Ruthven. The first two innings were scoreless. Craig Reynolds scored on a Terry Puhl single in the third to give Houston the lead, but the Phillies came right back in the fourth when Mike Schmidt and Greg Luzinski hit back-to-back doubles and then Maddox singled scoring Luzinski. The Astros tied it in the seventh when Phul doubled and brought Ryan home following a walk to the Houston pitcher. The Phillies threatened in the bottom of the seventh when Larry Bowa and Bob Boone singled and then advanced on a Gross sacrifice bunt. Lefty Joe Sambito was called in to relieve Ryan and walked Rose to load the bases. Sambito struck out Bake McBride and was pulled in favor of the right-handed Dave Smith who promptly struck out Schmidt to end the inning with the bases full of Phillies. Each team would score in the eighth to tie the game and both teams would go scoreless in the ninth to send the game to extra innings. Phul had his third hit in the tenth and moved to second on an Enos Cabell sacrifice. After an intentional walk to Morgan, José Cruz singled home Phul to give the Astros the lead. A Bake McBride error advanced the runners. Cedeño's grounder scored pinch runner Rafael Landestoy with the second run of the inning. Dave Bergman who was a defensive replacement for Art Howe in the eighth hit a triple off Phillies reliever Kevin Saucier to give Houston a 7–3 lead in the middle of the tenth. The Phillies were able to score one run in the bottom of the tenth but Joaquín Andújar was able to end the game by getting Schmidt to fly out to Phul for the final out. The Astros were feeling good about their chances as the final three games moved to Houston.

Game three of the 1980 NLCS was a classic pitching duel and somewhat typical of the Astrodome. The Astrodome was a pitchers' park and the Astros teams of the time were built on good pitching, solid defense and geared to stealing bases and scrapping out runs. If the Astros could score just one run, their chances of beating the other team were good. Thus was the case when Joe Niekro got the call in game three facing Larry Christenson of the Phillies. Both teams went scoreless through nine innings. Christenson would pitch six good innings for the Phillies, but Niekro would go ten. Dave Smith came out in the 11th to hold the Phillies back. Tug McGraw who had entered the game in the eighth faced Morgan in the bottom of the 11th who had a lead off tripled over McBride to start the inning. Manager Bill Virdon would replace Morgan with Landestoy to pinch run. Denny Walling gave Houston a 2–1 series lead when he hit a fly ball, scoring Landestoy. The Astros won the game, but not without paying a hefty price. In the sixth inning César Cedeño was lost for the remainder of the playoffs when he dislocated his ankle trying to beat out a double-play ball. In addition Morgan was infuriated with Virdon for pulling him for pinch runner Landestoy creating a personal rift that would result in Morgan leaving the Astros at season's end.

Game four of the series proved to be just as exhilarating as the previous three games. Again fans saw a hard-fought game go into extra innings with the Phillies taking the lead and the win in the tenth inning. With the game tied in the tenth Pete Rose started a rally with a one-out single. Schmidt flied out for the second out and Luzinski step up to the plate pinch-hitting for McBride. Luzinski doubled off the left field wall in left and Rose rounded third never intending to hold up. Cruz relayed to Landestoy who threw to catcher Bruce Bochy. Rose then bowled over Bochy to score the winning run. The Phillies then got an insurance run to take the lead 5–3 and tie the series. It was then Ryan versus Rose.

Rookie Phillies pitcher Marty Bystrom was sent out by manager Dallas Green to face veteran Nolan Ryan. The rookie gave up a run in the first inning but then held the Astros at bay until the sixth inning. The Astros lead did not last long as Bob Boone hit a two-out single giving the Phillies the lead in the second. The Astros tied the game in the sixth with an Alan Ashby single that brought home Denny Walling. Houston took a 5–2 lead in the seventh, but the Phillies came back in the eighth with a single by Larry Bowa, a ground ball that Ryan was not able to handle thus killing a chance for a double play, then a textbook bunt by Greg Gross to load the bases. Ryan had pitch great ball in the third, fourth, fifth, sixth and seventh innings striking out six and holding the Phillies to just the two runs they had scored in the second. Now it was Ryan versus Rose. With the count 3–2, Rose fouled one off. Ryan then threw a costly ball four that allowed Bowa to score. Rose had won the battle and Ryan was pulled for Joe Sambito. The Phillies scored on a force at second leaving men on the corners and one out. Ken Forsch was brought in by Astros manager Bill Virdon to face Schmidt. Forsch struck out Schmidt for the second out of the inning. Forsch gave up a single letting another run score to tie the game 5–5. Manny Trillo the shocked the Astros and their fans when he tripled to left scoring two runs and giving the Phillies a 7–5 lead. The Astros came back in the eighth to rough up Tug McGraw for four single and two runs that were scored with two-outs. With the game tied 7–7 the two teams went to extra innings for the fourth straight game. The winner would advance to the World Series. Garry Maddox had the hit of his career when he doubled in Del Unser with one out to give the Phillies an 8–7 lead. That would be all they needed as the Astros failed to score in the bottom of the tenth.
Houston was on the brink of going to the World Series and had a taste of the post season for the first time. Astros teams were no longer looked at as mediocre. They would prove to contenders in the coming decade.,

1981–1985: The Chinese water torture offense and tough times
After the heartbreaking loss to the Phillies in the 1980 NLCS, the Astros were back for revenge in the free agent market. They signed longtime Dodgers pitcher Don Sutton and traded Jeffrey Leonard to the San Francisco Giants for Bob Knepper. The Astros had a rough start before the strike halted play for two months. Just days before the strike, the Astros traded pitcher Joaquín Andújar to St. Louis, where he would help the Cardinals to the World Series Championship the following season, for outfielder Tony Scott. Once the strike ended, baseball decided to add an extra layer to the playoffs by having the first-half division winner face the second-half winner. While the Dodgers won the first half, it would be Houston winning the second half. However, it wouldn't be easy since the Astros did not score too many runs. This was known as the "Chinese Water Torture" offense. They would have frequent 1–0 or 2–0 victories. The Astros would have a milestone on September 26 when Nolan Ryan pitched his fifth no-hitter against the Dodgers. A few weeks later, they were in the playoffs against the Dodgers in the 1981 National League Division Series. After the Astros won the first two games in dramatic fashion, the Dodgers won the next three in Dodger Stadium to earn the full NL West Title.

Afterward, the Astros would have three tough seasons. They would trade César Cedeño to Cincinnati for Ray Knight and Danny Heep to the Mets for Mike Scott. In the process, Bill Virdon was fired in favor of Bob Lillis. During this time, Dickie Thon was emerging as a premier shortstop, hitting 20 homers in 1983. But in April 1984, he was beaned by Mike Torrez. That would remove any chances for Thon of becoming a big-time shortstop.

1986 season
After a mediocre 1985 season, the Astros fired general manager Al Rosen and manager Bob Lillis. The former was supplanted by Dick Wagner, the man whose Reds defeated the Astros to win the 1979 NL West. The latter was replaced by Hal Lanier whose "box-office baseball" took Houston by storm. Before Lanier took over, fans were accustomed to Houston's occasional slow starts. But with Lanier leading the way, Houston got off to a hot start, winning 13 of their first 19 contests.

The Astros had many highlights. After the Astrodome hosted the Major League Baseball All-Star Game in July, the Astros went on a streak with five straight come-from-behind wins (two against the Mets and three against the Montreal Expos). In a game against the Dodgers, pitcher Jim Deshaies (who came from the Yankees in exchange for Joe Niekro) started the game with eight straight strikeouts. On September 25, Mike Scott helped his team clinch the NL West by no-hitting the San Francisco Giants. This was the only time in MLB history that any division was clinched via a no-hitter. Scott would finish the season with an 18–10 record and a Cy Young Award to go along with it.

Houston's opponents in the NLCS were their expansion cousins the New York Mets, a team that with 108 wins was considered a team for the ages, destined to win a World Championship. To add a hint of flavor to the matchup, both teams were celebrating their 25th season as MLB franchises that season.

The 1986 NLCS was noted for great drama and is considered one of the best postseason series ever. In Game 3, the Astros were ahead at Shea Stadium, 5–4, in the bottom of the 9th when closer Dave Smith gave up a two-run home run to Lenny Dykstra, giving the Mets a dramatic 6–5 win.

A historic bet on the series was made on live television between talk show host David Letterman, whose show was based in New York; and former Houston mayor Kathryn J. Whitmire. Letterman agreed to pay $2000 if the Astros won, and Whitmire agreed to hang a picture of Mookie Wilson in her office if the Mets won. When the Mets won, Whitemire displayed a 10' × 10' photo of Wilson in her office.

However, the signature game of the series was Game 6. Needing a win to get to Mike Scott (who had been dominant in the series) in Game 7, the Astros jumped off to a 3–0 lead in the first inning but neither team would score again until the 9th inning. In the 9th, starting pitcher Bob Knepper would give two runs, and once again the Astros would look to Dave Smith to close it out. However, Smith would walk Gary Carter and Darryl Strawberry, giving up a sacrifice fly to Ray Knight, tying the game. Despite having the go-ahead runs on base, Smith was able to escape the inning without any further damage.

There was no scoring until the 14th inning when the Mets would take the lead on a Wally Backman single and an error by left fielder Billy Hatcher. The Astros would get the run back in the bottom of the 14th when Hatcher (in a classic goat-to-hero-conversion-moment) hit one of the most dramatic home runs in NLCS history, off the left field foul pole. In the 16th inning, Darryl Strawberry doubled to lead off the inning and Ray Knight drove him home in the next at-bat. The Mets would score a total of three runs in the inning to take what appeared an insurmountable 7–4 lead. With their season on the line, the Astros would nonetheless rally for two runs to come to within 7–6. Kevin Bass came up with the tying and winning runs on base; however Jesse Orosco would strike him out, ending the game.

This 16-inning game held the record for the longest in MLB postseason history until October 9, 2005 when the Astros defeated the Atlanta Braves 7–6 in an 18-inning Division Series game. However, the 1986 game still holds the record for longest League Championship Series game. Also, Game 3 of the 2005 World Series would tie the record for longest World Series game at 14 innings, meaning that the Astros, despite having been to only 2 LCS and 1 World Series, have played in the longest game for each of the 3 levels in the modern MLB playoffs.

1987–1999: Rebuild, new owner, a new look, and a new success

While the Astros were dealing away their 1986 championship parts, they were grooming young players in the process, such as Ken Caminiti and Craig Biggio. Many people consider the best trade the Astros ever made to be their deal for Jeff Bagwell at the trading deadline in 1990. The Boston Red Sox, in a tight race for the American League East title, needed relief pitching help. The Astros gave the Red Sox journeyman Larry Andersen in exchange for minor-leaguer Bagwell, who would win the 1990 Eastern League MVP award for the AA New Britain Red Sox. With Mo Vaughn in their system, the Red Sox reasoned that Bagwell was expendable, and while Andersen did help the Red Sox to the divisional title, Bagwell went on to become the Astros' all-time home run leader and, in most people's minds, the second best overall player in Astros history, behind the great Craig Biggio. The trade was so lopsided that it appears on virtually any list of the best/worst trades in MLB history, and "Larry Andersen" became a popular phrase in Boston to describe the futility of the Red Sox front office during the 86-year "Curse of the Bambino." However, after the 1991 season, the Astros made one of the worst trades in franchise history, sending speedy outfielder Kenny Lofton to the Cleveland Indians for catcher Eddie Taubensee. Lofton would prove to be one of the best center fielders of the 1990s, earning five AL stolen base titles, six All-Star appearances, and four Gold Gloves.

The early 1990s were marked by the Astros' growing discontent with their home, the Astrodome. After the Astrodome was renovated for the primary benefit of the Houston Oilers, the Astros began to grow increasingly disenchanted with the facility. However, the move was not approved by other National League owners, thus compelling the Astros to remain in Houston. Shortly thereafter, McMullen (who also owned the NHL's New Jersey Devils) sold the team to Texas businessman Drayton McLane in 1993, who committed to keeping the team in Houston.

Shortly after McLane's arrival, which coincided with the maturation of Bagwell and Biggio, the Astros began to show signs of consistent success. After finishing second in their division in 1994 (in a strike year), 1995, and 1996, the Astros won consecutive division titles in 1997, 1998, and 1999. In the 1998 season, the Astros set a team record with 102 victories. However, each of these titles was followed by a first-round playoff elimination, in 1998 by the San Diego Padres and in 1997 and 1999 against the Atlanta Braves. The manager of these title teams was Larry Dierker, who had previously been a broadcaster and pitcher for the Astros.

Coinciding with the change in ownership, the team switched uniforms and team colors after the  season in order to go for a new, more serious image. The team's trademark "Rainbow Guts" uniforms were retired, and the team's colors changed to midnight blue and metallic gold. The "Astros" font on the team logo was changed to a more aggressive one, and the team's traditional star logo was changed to a stylized, "flying" star with an open left end. It marked the first time since the team's inception that orange was not part of the team's colors. Despite general agreement that the rainbow uniforms identified with the team had become tired (and looked too much like a minor league team according to the new owners), the new uniforms and caps were never especially popular with fans.

Off the field, in 1994, the Astros hired one of the first African American general managers, former franchise player Bob Watson. Watson would leave the Astros after the 1995 season to become general manager of the New York Yankees and helped to lead the Yankees to a World Championship in 1996. He would be replaced by Gerry Hunsicker, who until 2004 would continue to oversee the building of the Astros into one of the better and most consistent organizations in the Major Leagues.

However, in 1996, the Astros again nearly left Houston. By the mid-1990s, McLane (like McMullen before him) wanted his team out of the Astrodome and was asking the city to build the Astros a new stadium. When things did not progress quickly toward that end, he put the team up for sale. He had nearly finalized a deal to sell the team to businessman William Collins, who planned to move them to Northern Virginia. However, Collins was having difficulty finding a site for a stadium himself, so Major League owners stepped in and forced McLane to give Houston another chance to grant his stadium wish. Houston voters responded positively via a stadium referendum and the Astros stayed put.

In the 14 years since Drayton McLane has taken ownership of the Houston Astros, they have had the fourth best record in all of Major League Baseball. Only the Yankees, Red Sox, and Braves have done better overall.

2000s: New stadium; First pennant
After years at the outdated Astrodome, the Astros moved into their new stadium in 2000. Originally called Enron Field, the stadium was one of the first to feature a functional retractable roof, considered a necessity in Houston. Additionally the ballpark featured more intimate surroundings than the cavernous Astrodome. It is believed by some that the departure of the NFL's Houston Oilers, after Houston refused to build them a new stadium, contributed to the construction of Enron Field. However, a new football stadium (now known as NRG Stadium) was eventually built for the expansion Houston Texans, and opened in 2002.

The ballpark features a train theme, since the ball park was built on the grounds of the old Union Station. The locomotive also pays homage to the history of Houston, where by 1860, 11 different railroad companies had lines running through the city. This is also represented in the city of Houston's official seal. A train whistle sounds, and a locomotive transverses a wall above the outfield after Astros hit a home run. The ballpark also contains quirks such as "Tal's Hill", which is a hill in deep center field on which a flagpole stands, all in fair territory. This was modeled after a similar feature that was located in Crosley Field, former home of the Cincinnati Reds. The terrace at Crosley Field was sloped at 15 degrees in left field, while Tal's Hill is sloped at 30° in straightaway center. Over the years, many highlight reel catches have been made by center fielders running up the hill to make catches.

Perhaps most significantly, with its short left field fence (only slightly longer to left field than Fenway Park), overall shorter dimensions, and exposure to the elements, including the humid Texas air, Enron Field played like a hitters' park. This was a dramatic difference from the Astrodome, which was considered to be an extreme pitchers' park. In a challenge to home run hitters, owner Drayton McLane's office windows, located in the old Union Station above left field, are made of glass and marked as 442' from home plate.

With the change in location also came a change in attire. Gone were the blue and gold uniforms of the 1990s in favor a more "retro" look with pinstripes, a traditional baseball font, and the colors of brick red, sand and black. The "shooting star" logo was modified but still retained its definitive look.

2004 season

After two fairly successful seasons without a playoff appearance, at midseason in 2004 the Astros were floundering. Before the season, the Astros had added star pitchers Andy Pettitte and Roger Clemens to a team that already included stars like Lance Berkman and Jeff Kent as well as the nucleus of Bagwell and Biggio. They were quickly anointed one of the favorites to win the National League. However, at the All-Star Break, they were 44–44 largely due to an inability to score runs, and a poor record in 1-run games. After being booed at the 2004 All-Star Game held at Minute Maid Park while serving as a coach for the National League, Williams was fired and replaced by Phil Garner, who had been a star for the Astros' second division winner in 1986. Though many people were highly skeptical of Garner, who had a mediocre track record in his prior managerial stints in Milwaukee and Detroit, with only one winning season at either stop (in 1992), the team responded to Garner, who led the team to a 46–26 record in the second half and the National League's Wild Card. They would go on to win their first playoff series in eight attempts, beating the Braves in five games of the National League Division Series to advance to the National League Championship Series for the third time. However, they would lose to the St. Louis Cardinals in seven games, most dramatically on a walk-off home run by Jim Edmonds in the 12th inning of Game 6.

The Astros' 2004 success had much to do with the postponed retirement of star pitcher Roger Clemens (a Houston resident), who ended 2004 with a record seventh Cy Young Award (his first in the NL). Clemens had previously announced that he was retiring after the  season from the New York Yankees. However, after the Astros signed his former Yankee teammate Andy Pettitte and offered Clemens a number of perquisites (including the option to stay home with his family for certain road trips when he wasn't scheduled to pitch), Clemens reconsidered and signed a one-year deal with the Astros.

Additionally, the mid-season addition of Carlos Beltrán in a trade with the Kansas City Royals helped the Astros tremendously in their playoff run. Despite rumblings in July and August that the Astros might flip him to another contender, Beltrán would prove instrumental to the Astros' hopes, hitting eight home runs in the postseason. Following the season, after initially asserting a desire to remain with the Astros, Beltrán signed a long-term contract with the New York Mets on January 9, 2005.

2005: Houston, we have a pennant

In 2005, the Astros got off to a poor start, dropping to 15 games below .500 (15–30) in late May before becoming nearly unbeatable. From that low point until the end of July, Houston went 42–17 and found themselves in the lead for the NL Wild Card. The hitting, largely absent in April and May, was suddenly there, with even the pitchers contributing.

The Astros had also developed an excellent pitching staff, anchored by Roy Oswalt, Andy Pettitte, Roger Clemens (who had a league-low ERA of only 1.87), and Brandon Backe. Rookie starters Ezequiel Astacio and Wandy Rodríguez were also successful.

In July alone, the Astros went 22–7, the best single month record in the club's history. The Astros finished the 2005 regular season by winning a wild card berth on the final day of the regular season, just as they did in 2004, becoming only the second team to come from 15 games under .500 to enter the postseason, the other team being the 1914 Boston Braves, now the Atlanta Braves. (Those Braves would go on and sweep the Philadelphia Athletics in the World Series. Coincidentally, the Astros beat out another Philadelphia team, the Phillies, for the Wild Card, to face the Braves in the first round of the playoffs.)

Playoffs
The Astros won their National League Division Series against the Atlanta Braves in four games. The fourth game set a record for a postseason game with most innings (18), most players used by a single team (T-23), most grand slams (2), and longest game time (5 hours and 50 minutes). Chris Burke hit a home run to win the game by a score of 7–6. Another notable performance was had by Roger Clemens, who appeared from the bullpen for only the second time in his career as a reliever with three shutout innings and the win. After winning in the first round, the Astros picked up where they left off in the previous year, facing a rematch against the St. Louis Cardinals.

Both the grand slam Lance Berkman hit in the 8th inning and the solo shot hit by Burke in the 18th inning to win three hours later were caught by the same fan, Shaun Dean, in the left field Crawford Boxes. Dean, a 25-year-old comptroller for a construction company, donated the balls to the Baseball Hall of Fame and he and his son were rewarded with gifts from the Astros and the Hall of Fame as well as playoff tickets behind home plate.

The National League Championship Series (NLCS) featured a rematch of the 2004 NLCS. The Astros lost the first game in St. Louis, but won the next three games with one in St. Louis and the next two in Houston. The Astros were poised to close out the series in Houston, but the Cardinals scored three runs in the top of the 9th inning with a 3-run home run by Albert Pujols off Brad Lidge with two outs. The stunned crowd was silenced in disbelief. This would take the series back to St. Louis, where the Astros won the final game of the NLCS and the final game played at Busch Stadium.

Current honorary National League President William Y. Giles presented the Astros the Warren C. Giles Trophy, which is awarded to the National League Champion. Roy Oswalt, who went 2–0 and had an ERA of 1.29, won the NLCS MVP.

World Series

The Astros' opponent in their first ever World Series was the Chicago White Sox. Games 1 and 2 were held at U.S. Cellular Field in Chicago, while Games 3 and 4 were played at Minute Maid Park. Game 3 also marked the first Fall Classic game to be played in the state of Texas, and was the longest game in World Series history, lasting 14 innings. Early conventional wisdom held that the White Sox were a slight favorite, but that Houston would be an even match. However, the Astros' situational hitting continued to plague them throughout the World Series. The White Sox swept the Astros in the best-of-seven series with a run differential of only six.

2006 season

After losing the World Series the Astros prepared for the offseason by signing Preston Wilson and moving Lance Berkman to first base, ending the long tenure by Jeff Bagwell. The Astros resigned pitcher Roger Clemens and traded two minor league prospects to the Tampa Bay Devil Rays for left-handed hitter Aubrey Huff and cash. In August 2006, Preston Wilson said that he wasn't getting enough playing time since Luke Scott returned from AAA ball with the Round Rock Express. In response the Astros released Wilson and the division rival Cardinals signed him for the rest of the season. After a dramatic last two weeks of the season, including a four-game sweep of the Cardinals, the Astros did not get to the playoffs losing their last game to the Braves, 3–1. The Astros had managed to win 10 of their last 12 games of the season, and all but erased what had been an  game lead by the front running St. Louis Cardinals. The Astros were within a  game of the Cardinals on Thursday September 28, but that is as close as the 2005 NL Champions would get.

On October 1 Astros were the last remaining team that still had a chance to reach the 2006 postseason; consequently they were the final MLB team to be officially eliminated from playoff contention.

On October 31, the Astros declined option on Jeff Bagwell's contract for 2007, subsequently ending his 15-year tenure as an Astro. Bagwell left his name well known in the Astros history books. On November 11, Bagwell files for free agency. Finally to end his amazing career, Bagwell announced his retirement on December 15.

On November 6, Roger Clemens and Andy Pettitte filed for free agency on Monday, five days before the Nov. 11 deadline.

On the complete opposite end of the spectrum, November 10, the Astros made a one-year deal with Craig Biggio worth $5.15 million to continue his march into the history books as he eyes 70 more hits to reach 3,000. This will mark Biggio's 20th season as an Astro.

On November 24, the Astros signed outfielder Carlos Lee to a 6-year contract for $100 million, a franchise record. They also signed pitcher Woody Williams.

On December 8, Andy Pettitte, who signed with the Astros in 2003, announced that he will be returning to the Yankees accepting a 1-year $16 million contract with player option year also worth $16 million if picked up. "It shocked me that [the Astros] would not continue to go up, when the Yankees continued to push and push and pursue and they [the Astros] really didn't do much", Pettitte said. "It was a full-court press by the Yankees. I've talked to the guys, and obviously they wanted me to come back up there." The Astros reportedly offered a one-year $12 million contract but would not offer a player option for another year.

On December 8, frustrated by the Pettitte negotiations, the Astros were on the verge of acquiring right-hander Jon Garland from the Chicago White Sox in return for Willy Taveras, Taylor Buchholz, and Jason Hirsh but the deal was nixed by the White Sox because right-hander Taylor Buchholz reportedly failed a physical.

On December 12, the Astros traded 3 for 2 when they traded Willy Taveras, Taylor Buchholz, and Jason Hirsh to the Colorado Rockies for Rockies pitchers Jason Jennings and Miguel Asencio. This trade turned out terribly for the Astros by the end of the 2007 season, as Taveras continued to develop, Hirsh had a strong rookie campaign, and Jennings was oft-injured and generally ineffective.

2007 season

On April 28, the Astros purchased the contract of Hunter Pence, the organization's top prospect from Triple-A affiliate, and made his debut that night where he got his first career hit and run scored.

By May 2007, the Astros had suffered one of their worst losing streaks since the 1995 season with 10 losses in a row, losing 4–3 to the Cincinnati Reds on May 30. The Astros were just one loss shy of tying their worst skid in franchise history, before snapping that streak the next day, also against the Reds.

On June 12, the Astros beat the Oakland Athletics for the first time in team history.

On June 28, second baseman Craig Biggio became the 27th player to accrue 3,000 career hits. On the same night in the bottom of the 11th inning Carlos Lee hit a towering walk-off grand slam to win the game for the Astros.

On July 24, Craig Biggio announced that he would be retiring at the end of the 2007 season, his 20th season with the club (and a franchise record). He hit a grand slam in that night's game which broke a 3–3 tie and led to an Astros win.

On July 28, the Astros traded RHP Dan Wheeler to Tampa Bay for right-handed slugger 3B Ty Wigginton and cash considerations. He is now signed through 2009. On July 29, long time and former All-Star third baseman Morgan Ensberg was designated for assignment to make room for newly acquired Wigginton.

On August 26, former first baseman Jeff Bagwell's number 5 was officially retired after a 15-year career with the Astros.

On August 27, manager Phil Garner and General Manager Tim Purpura were relieved of their duties. Cecil Cooper and Tal Smith were named as interim replacements, respectively.

On September 17, in a 6–0 loss to the Brewers the Astros were officially eliminated from the 2007 playoffs.

On September 20, Ed Wade was named as the new General Manager of the Astros. He made his first move as GM by trading Jason Lane to the Padres on September 24.

On September 30, Craig Biggio retired, ending a 20-year career with the Astros.

On November 7, the Astros traded RHP Brad Lidge and SS Eric Bruntlett to the Philadelphia Phillies for OF Michael Bourn, RHP Geoff Geary, and minor leaguer Mike Costanzo. Also utility player Mark Loretta accepts Houston's salary arbitration.

On November 30, the Astros and 2B Kazuo Matsui finalized a $16.5 million, 3-year contract.

On December 12, the Astros trade OF Luke Scott, RHP Matt Albers, RHP Dennis Sarfate, LHP Troy Patton, and minor-league 3B Mike Costanzo, to the Baltimore Orioles for SS Miguel Tejada.

On December 14, the Astros trade INF Chris Burke, RHP Juan Gutierrez, RHP Chad Qualls to the Arizona Diamondbacks for RHP José Valverde.

On December 27, the Astros came to terms on a deal with All-star, Gold Glove winner Darin Erstad.

2008 season

On January 11, the Astros started off 2008 by signing Brandon Backe to a one-year deal. During the rest of the month they also signed Ty Wigginton and Dave Borkowski to one-year deals.

In February the Astros signed Shawn Chacón to a one-year contract.

The Astros started off their Spring training campaign with a loss to Cleveland on the 28th. Spring training ended with a loss to the Detroit Tigers at Minute Maid before the Stros went on to face the Padres. Manager Cecil Cooper and General Manager Ed Wade had a tough decision to make before the trip. Astros pitcher Woody Williams had a bad spring going 0–4 throughout the stay in Florida. They released him on March 30 with which he retired.

The Astros also announced their starting pitching rotation. As usual Roy Oswalt was given the ball on opening day. With Jason Jennings in Texas and Woody retired, the Astros named Brandon Backe to the second spot. Wandy Rodríguez would get the ball in the third spot with Shawn Chacón and Chris Sampson following them in the #4 and 5 spots.

The Astros opened up their season in San Diego without second baseman Kazuo Matsui. Matsui, who had been injured in Spring training was completing a Minor League rehab assignment. The game that day was bad for Houston because Roy Oswalt gave up four runs in six innings of work. The final was 4–0, Padres. Also the Astros lost the second game of the series with Mark Loretta and Geoff Blum also starting.

On Rodríguez's start, the Astros won their first game with a 9–6 victory over the Padres. Berkman hit a game-winning three-run home run in the 9th. In the final game of the series of the series Shawn Chacón pitched a good game but the Astros lost after Chacón exited with the score tied 2–2.

In May, the Astros have made some roster moves by sending rookie catcher J. R. Towles to the Triple A Round Rock Express and calling up center fielder Reggie Abercrombie. Dave Borkowski was sent down earlier in the month and Chris Sampson was moved to the bullpen and Brian Moheler moving into the starting rotation.

On June 25, Shawn Chacón was suspended indefinitely for insubordination. The next day the Astros placed him on waivers.

On June 28, the Astros beat the Boston Red Sox for the first time in team history. They have played Boston previously in 2003, but they were swept when they played in Fenway Park.

On September 14, the Astros lost a no-hitter to the Chicago Cubs while playing in Milwaukee due to Hurricane Ike.

2010–2014: 100-loss seasons, Move to the American League West and Rebuilding
The 2010 season was the first season as Astros manager for Brad Mills, who was previously the bench coach of the Boston Red Sox. The Astros struggled throughout a season that was marked by trade-deadline deals that sent long time Astros to other teams. On July 29, the Astros' ace starting pitcher, Roy Oswalt, was dealt to the Philadelphia Phillies for J. A. Happ and two minor league players. On July 31, outfielder Lance Berkman was traded to the New York Yankees for minor leaguers Jimmy Paredes and Mark Melancon. The Astros finished with a record of 76–86.

On July 30, 2011, the Astros traded OF Hunter Pence, the team's 2010 leader in home runs, to the Philadelphia Phillies. On July 31, they traded OF Michael Bourn to the Atlanta Braves. On September 17, the Astros clinched their first 100-loss season in franchise history, On September 28, the Astros ended the season with an 8–0 home loss to the St. Louis Cardinals. Cardinals pitcher Chris Carpenter pitched a complete game, two-hit shutout in the game, enabling the Cardinals to win the National League Wild Card. The Astros finished with a record of 56–106, the worst single-season record in franchise history (a record which would be broken the following season).

In November 2010, Drayton McLane announced that the Astros were being put up for sale. McLane stated that because the Astros were one of the few franchises in Major League Baseball with only one family as the owners, he was planning his estate. McLane was 75 years old as of November 2011. In March 2011, local Houston businessman Jim Crane emerged as the front-runner to purchase the franchise. In the 1980s, Crane founded an air freight business which later merged with CEVA Logistics, and later founded Crane Capital Group. McLane and Crane had a previous handshake agreement for the franchise in 2008, but Crane abruptly changed his mind and broke off discussions. Crane also attempted to buy the Chicago Cubs in 2008 and the Texas Rangers during their 2010 bankruptcy auction. Crane came under scrutiny because of previous allegations of discriminatory hiring practices regarding women and minorities, among other issues. This delayed MLB's approval process. During the summer of 2011, a frustrated Crane hinted that the delays might threaten the deal. In October 2011, Crane met personally with MLB Commissioner Bud Selig, in a meeting that was described as "constructive".

On November 15, 2011, it was announced that Crane had agreed to move the franchise to the American League for the 2013 season. The move was part of an overall divisional realignment of MLB, with the National and American leagues each having 15 teams in three geographically balanced divisions. Crane was given a $70 million concession by MLB for agreeing to the switch; the move was a condition for the sale to the new ownership group. Two days later, the Astros were officially sold to Crane after the other owners unanimously voted in favor of the sale. It was also announced that 2012 would be the last season for the Astros in the NL. After over 50 years of the Astros being a part of the National League, this move was unpopular with many Astros fans.

2012
In 2012, Sig Mejdal implemented the STOUT sabermetrics system (a combination of the words "scout" and "statistics") for Astros. The system was criticized for de-humanizing players, but led to the Astro's farm system becoming ranked among the best in baseball in large part due to the previous Astros GM Ed Wade and current GM Jeff Luhnow. The Astros Major League team, however, continued to struggle. The Astros were eliminated from the playoffs in early September, and finished with the worst record in Major League Baseball (55–107). Their 2012 record surpassed their 2011 record as the worst in Houston Astros history.

To mark their move to the American League for the 2013 season, the Astros debuted new navy blue and orange uniforms. They also debuted a new cap that featured the classic white "H" over an orange star. On November 6, 2012, the Astros hired former Cleveland Indians director of baseball operations David Stearns as the team's new assistant general manager. The Astros would also go on to hire former St Louis Cardinals front office executive Jeff Luhnow as their general manager.

The Houston Astros won their first American League game on March 31, 2013, against the Texas Rangers. The score was 8–2. On September 29, the Astros completed their first year in the American League, losing 5–1 in a 14-inning game to the New York Yankees. The Astros finished the season with a 51–111 record (a franchise worst) with a season-ending 15-game losing streak, again surpassing their worst record from last season. The team finished 45 games behind the first-place Oakland Athletics. This was the Astros' third consecutive season with more than 100 losses. They also became the first team to have the first overall pick in the draft three years in a row. They improved on their season in 2014, going 70–92, finishing 28 games behind the first-place Los Angeles Angels of Anaheim, and placing fourth in the AL West, ahead of the Texas Rangers. After a slow start, the Astros took over first place in the AL West on April 19 and stayed there until shortly before the All-Star Break in mid-July. The Astros retook first place on July 29 and remained there until September 15.

2015 to present: Golden Era, scandal, and moving on
In September 2015, four men died who had been closely associated with the team: Yogi Berra, Gene Elston, Milo Hamilton, and John McMullen. McMullen and Hamilton passed on the same Thursday, September 17, 2015, Elston on September 5, and Berra on September 22. McMullen, after being a co-owner of the New York Yankees, purchased the Astros in 1979. He also brought Nolan Ryan to the Astros. In 1980, the Astros played the Philadelphia Phillies for the NL pennant with Gene Elston on the radio. In 1985, McMullen brought Yogi Berra in to be a bench coach for the new Astros manager Hal Lanier for the 1986 season, with Milo Hamilton on the radio.

As for the 2015 MLB season, the Houston Astros finished 86–76 (.531), and made the playoffs for the first time since 2005. Dallas Keuchel led the AL with 20 victories, going 15–0 at home, an MLB record. Key additions to the team included Scott Kazmir and SS Carlos Correa who hit 22 home runs, being called up in June 2015. 2B José Altuve picked up where he left off as the star of the Astros' offense. On July 30, the Astros picked up Mike Fiers and Carlos Gomez from the Milwaukee Brewers. Fiers threw the 11th no-hitter in Astros history on August 21 against the LA Dodgers. Houston got the final AL playoff spot and faced the Yankees in the Wild Card Game on October 6 at New York. They defeated the Yankees 3–0, but lost to the Kansas City Royals in the American League Division Series. The series went the full five games.

The Astros split the first two games of the ALDS best-of-five series in Kansas City. The Astros won the first game at Minute Maid to take a 2–1 lead in the ALDS. In game 4, after 7 innings, the Astros had a 6–2 lead. In the top half of the eighth inning, which took about 45 minutes to end, the Royals had taken 7–6 lead with a series of consecutive base hits. The Astros suffered a 9–6 loss and the 2015 ALDS was tied at 2–2. Then the 2015 ALDS went back to Kansas City, where the Royals clinched the series in the fifth game.

In 2017, the Astros won their first World Series title. The next year they won more than 100 games again, becoming the first team with consecutive 100+ win seasons. They went 107–55 in 2019 and advanced to the World Series on a home run in Game 6 of the 2019 American League Championship Series by Jose Altuve. However, the Astros lost in seven games to the Washington Nationals. Later, it was alleged they had been stealing signs in both the 2017 and portions of the 2018 season. As punishment, the Astros were forced to pay a $5 million fine and forfeit their first- and second-round picks in the 2020 and 2021 drafts. Manager A.J. Hinch and General Manager Jeff Luhnow were both fired during this season for their part in the sign stealing scandal.

In the shortened 2020 season, they went 29–31 and made the postseason, owing to MLB deciding to have the top two of each divisions and two Wild Card teams make the playoffs; it was the first time the Astros made the postseason in four straight seasons. They would end up facing each division champion in the AL while becoming the first under .500 team to win a postseason series as they beat the Minnesota Twins and Oakland Athletics. In the ALCS, they became the second MLB team after the 2004 Boston Red Sox to force a seventh game in a best-of-seven series after trailing three games to none, but lost the seventh game to the Tampa Bay Rays.

In 2021, the Houston Astros were once again a winning team and clinched the AL West crown with a 95–67 record to win the AL West for the fourth time in five seasons while clinching a tremendous accomplishment of making the playoffs for the sixth time in seven seasons, which is the most successful span of playoff appearances in franchise history. They defeated the Boston Red Sox in the ALCS to go to their third World Series in five years, where they lost to the Atlanta Braves in six games. In 2022, they returned to the World Series, where they defeated the Philadelphia Phillies in six games.

References

Houston Astros
History of Major League Baseball by team